Vice is a 2008 crime film directed and written by Raul Inglis and starring Michael Madsen and Daryl Hannah.

Premise 
An undercover drug deal goes wrong and Max (Michael Madsen) sees the other cops involved start dropping. While trying to investigate the murders, he must deal with his own personal demons.

Cast
 Michael Madsen as Max Walker
 Daryl Hannah as Salt
 Mykelti Williamson as Sampson
 Mark Boone Junior as Bugsby
 Kurupt as T.J. Greene
 John Cassini as Travalino
 Chelah Horsdal as Woman In Elevator
 Justine Warrington as Hooker

Production
Filming took place in Los Angeles, California, as well as Vancouver, British Columbia on a budget of just over four million dollars. It was released in May 2008 to mixed reviews. Rotten Tomatoes rates Vice at 40%. Robert Koehler of Variety said in his review; "Vice has the potential to be a vastly more interesting moral drama than it becomes (...) However, these sins are comparatively mild compared to those in Bad Lieutenant or The French Connection.

References

External links
 
 

2008 films
American crime drama films
2008 crime drama films
Films scored by Cliff Martinez
Films shot in Los Angeles
Films shot in Vancouver
2000s English-language films
2000s American films